Hallaxa is a genus of sea slugs, dorid nudibranchs, shell-less marine gastropod molluscs in the family Actinocyclidae.

Species 
Species in the genus Hallaxa include:

 Hallaxa albopunctata Gosliner & S. Johnson, 1994
 Hallaxa apefae  Marcus, 1957
 Hallaxa atrotuberculata Gosliner & S. Johnson, 1994
 Hallaxa chani  Gosliner & Williams, 1975
 Hallaxa cryptica  Gosliner & Johnson, 1994
 Hallaxa decorata  Bergh, 1905
 Hallaxa elongata Gosliner & S. Johnson, 1994
 Hallaxa fuscescens  Pease, 1871
 Hallaxa gilva Miller, 1987
 Hallaxa hileenae  Gosliner & Johnson, 1994
 Hallaxa iju  Gosliner & Johnson, 1994
 Hallaxa indecora (Bergh, 1877)
 Hallaxa michaeli  Gosliner & Johnson, 1994
 Hallaxa paulinae  Gosliner & Johnson, 1994
 Hallaxa translucens Gosliner & S. Johnson, 1994

References

External links

Actinocyclidae
Gastropod genera

it:Actinocyclus
nl:Actinocyclus